David McKenzie may refer to:

David McKenzie (economist), lead economist at the World Bank's Development Research Group, Finance and Private Sector Development Unit
David McKenzie (Victorian politician), member of the Australian House of Representatives
David McKenzie (South Australian politician) (1842–1919), member of the South Australian House of Assembly
David McKenzie (sprinter) (born 1970), British track and field athlete
David McKenzie (cyclist) (born 1974), Australian cyclist
David McKenzie (fencer) (1936–1981), Australian fencer
David McKenzie (golfer) (born 1967), Australian golfer
David McKenzie (footballer) (born 1942), Australian footballer

See also
Dave McKenzie (disambiguation)
David MacKenzie (disambiguation)